Gabriel Emiliano Copola (born January 20, 1984) is an Argentine para table tennis player with competition Classification 3. He plays for MdO (colonia Montes de Oca) in Buenos Aires, Buenos Aires. Copola's current ranking is world number 11 in class 3, his highest ranking was world number 5 in February 2016.

Career
A lover of sports, Copola had a bicycle accident when he was 11, which left him paraplegic. He began playing table tennis in 1999 and made his international debut the same year, representing Argentina at the 2011 Parapan American Games in Mexico, where he won the gold medal in the Men's singles C3 competition and thus qualified for the London 2012 Paralympic Games.

Career Record

Para Panamerican Championships
 2011 Guadalajara: Men's Singles Class 3
 2011 Guadalajara: Men's Team Class 5
 2009 Margarita Island: Men's Team Class 5
 2005 Mar del Plata: Men's Team Class 3
 2005 Mar del Plata: Men's Wheelchair Open
 2003 Brasília: Men's Team
 2001 Buenos Aires: Men's Team

References

1984 births
Table tennis players at the 2016 Summer Paralympics
Table tennis players at the 2012 Summer Paralympics
Argentine male table tennis players
Living people
Paralympic table tennis players of Argentina
Wheelchair category Paralympic competitors
Sportspeople from Buenos Aires
People from Ituzaingó Partido
People with paraplegia
Medalists at the 2011 Parapan American Games
Table tennis players at the 2020 Summer Paralympics
21st-century Argentine people